Edwin Hess Burba Jr. (born September 13, 1936) is a retired United States Army four-star general who served as commander-in-chief of the United States Army Forces Command from 1989 to 1993. His father was also a general officer who served as deputy commander of First United States Army from 1968 to 1970, and died in a plane crash.

Military career
Burba was born in McAlester, Oklahoma on September 13, 1936 (one of two 4-star generals born in McAlester, the other being Bennie L. Davis, commander of Strategic Air Command). He attended the United States Military Academy and graduated in 1959, receiving his commission as a second lieutenant. He has also earned a Master of Science degree in International Affairs from George Washington University, and is a graduate of the Infantry Officer Basic and Advance courses, the Armed Forces Staff College and the National War College.

Burba served two tours in Vietnam, and has commanded at all levels from platoon to major command, to include the United States Army Infantry School and the 7th Infantry Division. As an army officer, he served as Chief of Field Training at the United States Air Force Academy. Prior to assuming command of United States Army Forces Command, he was Commanding General of the Combined Field Army, ROK/US. He retired from the army in 1993.

Decorations
Burba's awards and decorations include the Defense Distinguished Service Medal, Army Distinguished Service Medal, Silver Star, Legion of Merit, Bronze Star Medal, Air Medal with 13 Oak Leaf Clusters, and Purple Heart. He has also earned the Master Parachutist Badge, Ranger tab and the Combat Infantryman Badge.

Post-military
After retiring from the military, Burba worked as a Senior Mentor with the army's Battle Command Training Program, has sat on the Board of Advisors for the National Infantry Foundation, and the Board of Directors of Global Payments, Inc. He is the 2003 recipient of the Distinguished Graduate Award from the Association of Graduates, the United States Military Academy alumni association.

Burba and his wife Trish have three daughters.

References

1936 births
Living people
United States Army generals
United States Military Academy alumni
United States Army personnel of the Vietnam War
Recipients of the Distinguished Service Medal (US Army)
Recipients of the Silver Star
Recipients of the Legion of Merit
People from McAlester, Oklahoma
Elliott School of International Affairs alumni
Recipients of the Air Medal
Recipients of the Defense Distinguished Service Medal
National War College alumni